Kupferstrang is a small river of Lower Saxony, Germany. It is a branch of the Innerste in Hildesheim.

See also
List of rivers of Lower Saxony

Rivers of Lower Saxony
0Kupferstrang
Rivers of Germany